Felipe Verdú (13 February 1928 – 16 March 2002) was a Spanish boxer. He competed in the men's featherweight event at the 1948 Summer Olympics.

References

1928 births
2002 deaths
Spanish male boxers
Olympic boxers of Spain
Boxers at the 1948 Summer Olympics
Sportspeople from Alicante
Featherweight boxers